Deborah Levy  (born 6 August 1959) is a British novelist, playwright and poet. She initially concentrated on writing for the theatre – her plays were staged by the Royal Shakespeare Company – before focusing on prose fiction. Her early novels included Beautiful Mutants, Swallowing Geography and Billy & Girl. Her more recent fiction has included the Booker-shortlisted novels Swimming Home and Hot Milk, as well as the Booker-longlisted The Man Who Saw Everything and the short-story collection Black Vodka.

Early life and education
Levy was born in Johannesburg, South Africa, the granddaughter of working-class Lithuanian Jewish immigrants on her father's side, and an upper-middle-class "English colonial" family, as she described it, on her mother's side. Her father, Norman Levy, was a member of the African National Congress and an academic and historian. Her mother was Philippa (née Murrell). Her father was placed under a banning order by the Apartheid government from 1964 until the family fled to London in 1968, initially living in Wembley before moving to Petts Wood. Her parents divorced in 1974.

She was educated at St Saviour’s and St Olave’s School, Southwark, and then at Hampstead School. She then trained at Dartington College of Arts, which she was inspired to attend by Derek Jarman, whom she met while working as an usher at Notting Hill's Gate Cinema.

Work

Theatre
After leaving Dartington in 1981, Levy wrote a number of plays, including Pax, Heresies for the Royal Shakespeare Company, and others (Clam, The B File, Pushing the Prince into Denmark, Macbeth – False Memories, and Honey, Baby), which are published in Levy: Plays 1 (Methuen).

She was director and writer for Man Act Theatre Company, a radical group that operated under the umbrella of Cardiff Laboratory Theatre, based at Chapter Arts Centre.

Poetry
Levy's major work as a poet is An Amorous Discourse in the Suburbs of Hell (1990), which takes the form of a conversation between an angel and an accountant. It considers the struggle between, on the one hand, spontaneity and ambition, and, on the other, logic and contentment.

Fiction
Levy published a collection of short stories, Ophelia and the Great Idea, in 1985. Her first novel, Beautiful Mutants, was published in 1987 by Jonathan Cape. Her second novel, Swallowing Geography, was published in 1993, also by Cape, and her third, Billy and Girl, was published in 1996 by Bloomsbury. Her short story "Proletarian Zen" was published in PEN New Fiction in 1985 by PEN International and Quartet Books.

Swimming Home (And Other Stories, 2011) was shortlisted for the Man Booker Prize 2012 among other awards. Levy published a short story collection, Black Vodka (And Other Stories, 2013), which cemented her reputation as "one of the most exciting voices in contemporary British fiction." Her novel Hot Milk was published in 2016 and was shortlisted for the Man Booker Prize 2016.

One of Levy's short stories, "Stardust Nation", was adapted as a graphic novel by Andrzej Klimowski, emeritus professor at the Royal College of Art, and published by SelfMadeHero in 2016.

In 2019 her novel The Man Who Saw Everything was longlisted for the Booker Prize.

Autobiographies
Levy's first volume of autobiography, Things I Don't Want to Know, was written in response to George Orwell's essay "Why I Write" and was published in 2013.

In 2018, she published a second volume, The Cost of Living. She has described them as "living" autobiographies, since they are "hopefully not being written at the end, with hindsight, but in the storm of life".

The final volume, Real Estate, was published in May 2021.

Style and themes
Writing in the London Review of Books in 2016, Alice Spawls commented on several unconventional characteristics of Levy's writing: she "doesn't like stable narrators", has a "preference for shifting perspectives – she especially likes looking at one character through another", and "is interested in women who don’t have homes and aren't sure where to look for them" ("women who like to dissect things, who reassure themselves with cataloguing and calculating, as though people and feelings could be contained by indices"). Spawls noted that Levy's stories "almost always begin with a failure of language", explaining that Levy "has said that she's not interested in the most articulate person in the room, and that her work is informed by the theatre director Zofia Kalinska’s statement: 'We always hesitate when we wish for something. In my theatre, I like to show the hesitation and not to conceal it. A hesitation is not the same as a pause. It is an attempt to defeat the wish.

Leo Robson, reviewing The Man Who Saw Everything in the New Statesman, provided this overview: "Levy’s project as a writer is itself about effacing borders – between the novel of ideas and the novel of sentiment, between the schematic and the fluent, the inevitable and the accidental, the cerebral and immersive, the sensuous (or somatic) and cerebral, the parochial and otherworldly, metaphor and literalism. If this sounds vague, it should."

In her review of Levy's 2013 story collection Black Vodka, Lauren Elkin emphasized the philosophical qualities of Levy's work, writing that "Levy makes an aesthetic and ethics of 'elsewhereness'--being apart is another way of being together--and she explores the bonds we choose to create or break, and the ones we can't decide about.[...] Levy sensitively conveys the phenomenology of textures, of skin and breath. Embedded in her coiled, polished sentences is the drive that pushes us together, and forces us apart."

Academic
Levy was a Fellow Commoner in Creative Arts at Trinity College, Cambridge, from 1989 to 1991. From 2006 to 2009, she was AHRB Fellow in Creative and Performing Arts at the Royal College of Art. She was a visiting professor at Falmouth School of Art, Falmouth University, from 2013 to 2015, and from 2018 to 2019 was a fellow of Columbia University's Institute for Ideas and Imagination.

Personal life
Levy married David Gale, a playwright, in 1997. The couple, who have two daughters, are now divorced.

Awards and honours
2001: Lannan Literary Fellowship, and 2004 Residency, Marfa
2012: Specsavers National Book Awards, UK Author of the Year prize shortlist for Swimming Home
2012: Man Booker Prize shortlist for Swimming Home
2012: BBC International Short Story Award shortlist for "Black Vodka"
2013: Jewish Quarterly Wingate Prize shortlist for Swimming Home
2013: Frank O'Connor International Short Story Award shortlist for Black Vodka
2016: Man Booker Prize shortlist for Hot Milk
2017: Fellow of the Royal Society of Literature
2019: Booker Prize longlist for The Man Who Saw Everything
2020: Prix Femina étranger for Things I Don't Want to Know and The Cost of Living, translated into French by Céline Leroy.
The Guardian ranked The Cost of Living number 84 in its list of "The 100 best books of the 21st century".

Bibliography

References

External links
"An Interview with Deborah Levy" , BookSlut, May 2004
Deborah Levy , doollee

Living people
1959 births
20th-century British dramatists and playwrights
20th-century British novelists
20th-century British women writers
21st-century British dramatists and playwrights
21st-century British novelists
21st-century British women writers
British people of Lithuanian-Jewish descent
British women dramatists and playwrights
British women novelists
Fellows of the Royal Society of Literature
Columbia University fellows
Fellows of Trinity College, Cambridge
People from Johannesburg
People from Petts Wood
Prix Femina Étranger winners
South African people of English descent
South African people of Lithuanian-Jewish descent
Weird fiction writers
Writers from Wembley